Lerone Murphy (born July 22, 1991) is an English mixed martial artist who competes in the Featherweight division of the Ultimate Fighting Championship.

Background

Murphy, who was born and raised in Old Trafford, went to St Edward's Primary School in Rusholme 
and St Mary's Levenshulme and St Anne's High Catholic High School in Heaton Chapel, Stockport. He had been a promising footballer, who went on trials for Liverpool F.C. and had trained with both Stockport County and FC United as a teenager, until at the age of 16 after he suffered a serious knee injury that prematurely ended his football dreams. Being the nephew of Manchester boxing trainer, the late Oliver Harrison, who had trained the likes of Amir Khan and Rocky Fielding, Murphy had done some boxing training, but started his MMA training when he walked into the All Powers gym.

On Saturday May 25, 2013, Lerone having just left a barber shop on Lloyd Street South in the Manchester suburb of Fallowfield, was shot by a gunman. Lerone was hit by three bullets, being hit on the face and neck twice. Due to the injuries, Murphy had to get a set of prosthetic teeth and has a tiny shard of bullet, permanently embedded in his tongue.

Mixed martial arts career

Early career

Making his MMA debut at FCC 15, he faced Martin Fouda and went on to defeat him via unanimous decision. Murphy would go on to defeat Tyler Thomas at Tanko FC 3, Jamie Lee at FCC 18, Nathan Thompson at FCC 19, Terry Doyle at FightStar Championship 14, all via first round TKO. He would go on to defeat his next two opponents via unanimous decision; James McErlean at Evolution Of Combat Fight Night 2 and Anton De Paepe at Celtic Gladiator 22. For his final appearance in the UK regional scene, Murphy won the FCC Featherweight Championship at FCC 23 against Manolo Schianna via TKO in the first round.

Ultimate Fighting Championship
Murphy made his UFC debut against Zubaira Tukhugov on September 7, 2019 at UFC 242. The back-and-forth fight ended in a split draw with one judge assigning each fighter a 29-28 win and the third seeing it as a 28-28 draw.

Murphy faced Ricardo Ramos on July 16, 2020 at UFC on ESPN: Kattar vs. Ige. He won the fight via technical knockout in round one, earning himself a Performance of the Night bonus.

After his second fight in the promotion, Murphy renewed his contract with the UFC.

Murphy faced Douglas Silva de Andrade on January 20, 2021 at UFC on ESPN 20. He won the bout via unanimous decision.

Murphy was scheduled to face Charles Jourdain on September 4, 2021 at UFC Fight Night 191. However, Murphy was pulled from the event due to visa issues, and he was replaced by Julian Erosa.

Replacing an injured Tristan Connelly, Murphy stepped in on short notice against Makwan Amirkhani at UFC 267 on October 30, 2021. Murphy won the bout via knockout early in the second round.

Murphy was scheduled to face Nate Landwehr on March 26, 2022 at UFC on ESPN: Blaydes vs. Daukaus. However, Murphy withdrew from the bout for undisclosed reasons and was replaced by David Onama.

Murphy was scheduled to face Nathaniel Wood on March 18, 2023 at UFC 286. However, Wood was forced to withdraw from the event due to leg injury and was replaced by UFC newcomer Gabriel Santos. Murphy won the fight via split decision.

Personal life
Murphy has a son.

Championships and achievements

Mixed martial arts
Full Contact Contender 
 FCC Featherweight Championship (One Time)
 Ultimate Fighting Championship
Performance of the Night (One time) 
MMAjunkie.com
2021 October Knockout of the Month vs. Makwan Amirkhani

Mixed martial arts record

|-
|Win
|align=center|12–0–1
|Gabriel Santos
|Decision (split)
|UFC 286
|
|align=center|3
|align=center|5:00
|London, England
|
|-
| Win
| align=center|
|Makwan Amirkhani
|KO (knee)
|UFC 267 
|
|align=center|2
|align=center|0:14
|Abu Dhabi, United Arab Emirates
|  
|-
| Win
| align=center|
| Douglas Silva de Andrade
| Decision (unanimous)
| UFC on ESPN: Chiesa vs. Magny
| 
| align=center|3
| align=center|5:00
| Abu Dhabi, United Arab Emirates
|
|-
| Win
| align=center|9–0–1
| Ricardo Ramos
|TKO (punches)
|UFC on ESPN: Kattar vs. Ige 
|
|align=center|1
|align=center|4:18
|Abu Dhabi, United Arab Emirates
|
|-
|Draw
| align=center|8–0–1
| Zubaira Tukhugov
|Draw (split)
|UFC 242 
|
|align=center|3
|align=center|5:00
|Abu Dhabi, United Arab Emirates
|
|-
| Win
| align=center|8–0
| Manolo Scianna
|TKO (punches)
| Full Contact Contender 23
| 
| align=center|1
| align=center|2:22
| Bolton, England
|
|-
| Win
| align=center| 7–0
| Ayton De Paepe
| Decision (unanimous)
| Celtic Gladiator 22
| 
|align=Center|3
|align=center|5:00
| Manchester, England
| 
|-
| Win
| align=center| 6–0
| James McErlean
| Decision (unanimous)
| Evolution Of Combat: Fight Night 2
|
|align=Center|3
|align=center|5:00
|Morecambe, England
| 
|-
| Win
| align=center| 5–0
| Terry Doyle
| TKO (punches)
| FightStar Championship 14
| 
| align=center| 1
| align=center| 0:42
| London, England
| 
|-
| Win
| align=center| 4–0
| Nathan Thompson
| TKO (punches)
| Full Contact Contender 19
| 
| align=center| 1
| align=center| 0:48
| Bolton, England
| 
|-
| Win
| align=center| 3–0
| Jamie Lee
| TKO (punches)
| Full Contact Contender 18
| 
| align=center| 1
| align=center| 3:55
| Bolton, England
| 
|-
| Win
| align=center| 2–0
| Tyler John Thomas
| TKO (punches)
| Tanko Fighting Championships 3
| 
| align=center| 1
| align=center| 1:55
| Manchester, England
|
|-
| Win
| align=center| 1–0
| Martin Fouda Afana Bipouna
| Decision (unanimous)
| Full Contact Contender 15
| 
| align=center| 3
| align=center| 5:00
| Bolton, England
|

See also 
 List of current UFC fighters
 List of male mixed martial artists
 List of undefeated mixed martial artists

References

External links 
  
 

Living people
1991 births
English male mixed martial artists
Featherweight mixed martial artists
Mixed martial artists utilizing Brazilian jiu-jitsu
Ultimate Fighting Championship male fighters
English practitioners of Brazilian jiu-jitsu
British shooting survivors